Swapan Bauri is an Indian politician. He was elected as MLA of Saltora Vidhan Sabha Constituency in West Bengal Legislative Assembly in 2011 and 2016. He is an All India Trinamool Congress politician.

References

Living people
Year of birth missing (living people)
Trinamool Congress politicians from West Bengal
West Bengal MLAs 2011–2016
West Bengal MLAs 2016–2021